The Wyoming United States House election for 1900 was held on November 6, 1900. Former Republican representative Frank Wheeler Mondell defeated Democratic John C. Thompson with 59.21% of the vote making Mondell the first Wyoming Representative to hold two consecutive terms.

Results

References

1900
Wyoming
1900 Wyoming elections